Calders is a summit of  in the Howgill Fells, Cumbria, England.

References

Peaks of the Yorkshire Dales
Hewitts of England
Mountains and hills of Cumbria
Sedbergh